, born ; 11 September 1966), is the wife of Fumihito, Crown Prince Akishino. Her husband is the younger brother and heir presumptive of Emperor Naruhito of Japan and the second son of Emperor Emeritus Akihito and Empress Emerita Michiko.

Kiko earned a PhD in humanities from Ochanomizu University. Her marriage to Fumihito in 1990 furthered the trend of Japanese imperial males marrying middle class commoners of academic prominence in earlier and current generations. The couple has three children: Mako, Kako, and Hisahito. Preceding Fumihito and Kiko's investiture as Crown Prince and Princess, the ongoing Japanese imperial succession debate had resulted in some politicians holding a favorable view on rescinding agnatic primogeniture imposed by World War II allies on the constitution of Japan. However, once Kiko and Fumihito had their son Hisahito in September 2006 he became next in the line of succession following his father. Hisahito's cousin and Emperor Naruhito's only child Princess Aiko remains at present legally ineligible to inherit the throne, while debate about the possibility of having future empresses regnant continues. 

As active working members of the imperial family, Kiko and Fumihito's schedule includes attending summits, and organizational and global event meetings. The couple has particularly represented the Japanese imperial house in ceremonies involving heads of state and VIPs abroad. Kiko's imperial patronages cluster around medical, science and children's causes.

Early life
Kiko was born at Shizuoka Saiseikai General Hospital in Suruga-ku, Shizuoka, Japan. She is the eldest daughter of Tatsuhiko Kawashima (1940–2021) and his wife, Kazuyo Sugimoto. The family moved to Philadelphia in 1967 while her father attended the University of Pennsylvania. He earned a doctorate at University of Pennsylvania in 1971 in regional science and later taught there.

Kiko attended elementary and high school in Vienna, Austria, when her father became the chief researcher at the International Institute for Applied Systems Analysis (IIASA) in Laxenburg, Austria, where he studied spatial science and NGO activities. The future princess became fluent in English and German. In 1972, they moved back to Japan, where her father taught economics at Gakushuin University in Tokyo. She lived with her parents and brother in a small on-campus apartment in Tokyo. She graduated from the Department of Psychology in the Faculty of Letters of Gakushuin University with a Bachelor of Letters degree in Psychology in 1989 and received a Master of Humanities degree in Social Psychology from the Graduate School of Gakushuin University in 1995. She received the PhD degree in Humanities from Ochanomizu University.

She participated in the Ship for Southeast Asian and Japanese Youth Program (SSEAYP) in 1987 and continues to be a supporter of the program.

Marriage
 
Prince Fumihito first proposed marriage to Kiko Kawashima on 26 June 1986 while they were both undergraduates at Gakushuin. Three years later, the Imperial Household Council announced the engagement on 12 September 1989 and the engagement ceremony was held on 12 January 1990. No marriage date would be set until the official one-year mourning period ended for Fumihito's grandfather, Emperor Hirohito, who had died in January 1989.

The wedding took place at an exclusive shrine at the Tokyo Imperial Palace on 29 June 1990. The Imperial Household Council had previously granted the prince permission to establish a new branch of the Imperial Family and the Emperor granted him the title Akishino-no-miya (Prince Akishino) on his wedding day. Upon marriage, his bride became Her Imperial Highness The Princess Akishino, known informally as Princess Kiko. As tradition dictates, upon her entry into the imperial family and like other members, she received a personal emblem: the blossom of the bristle-pointed beachhead iris Iris setosa which blooms in intense shades of dark lavender to blue.

The engagement and marriage of Prince Akishino to the former Kiko Kawashima broke precedent in several respects. At the time, the groom was still a graduate student at Gakushuin and he would be married before his older brother, Crown Prince Naruhito. Officials at the Imperial Household Agency were opposed to the marriage, and as was Prince Akishino's paternal-grandmother Empress Dowager Nagako. As the second woman from a middle-class and academician background to marry into the imperial family after her husband Akashino's mother Empress Michiko, she was given the nickname "the apartment princess" by the media. Although Empress Michiko was also born a commoner, she was from a very wealthy family; her father was the president of a large flour-milling company.

The Princess had said repeatedly that she wanted to finish her master's degree, if circumstances permitted. She completed her post-graduate studies in psychology between her official duties and received her master's degree in psychology in 1995. She is known for her continuing interest in deaf culture and the Deaf in Japan.  She learned Japanese sign language and she is a skilled sign language interpreter.  She attends the "Sign Language Speech Contest for High School Students" held every August, and "Praising Mothers Raising Children with Hearing Impairments" every December. In October 2008, she participated in the "38th National Deaf Women's Conference." She also signs in informal Deaf gatherings.

In March 2013, Kiko was granted a PhD degree in Psychology at the Graduate School of Humanities and Sciences, Ochanomizu University, for her dissertation entitled "Knowledge, perceptions, beliefs and behaviors related to tuberculosis: A study based on questionnaire surveys with seminar participants of the National Federation of Community Women's Organizations for TB Control and female college students."

While pregnant with her third child, Kiko was diagnosed with placenta praevia. The princess also had carpal tunnel syndrome osteoporosis aggravated by child-nursing, a symptom common among middle-aged women, her doctor revealed on 14 December 2007.

Children

Since 1997, Prince Fumihito and Princess Kiko and their children have maintained a principal residence on the grounds of the Akasaka Estate in Motoakasaka, Minato, Tokyo. The couple have two daughters and one son:

 ; formerly ; following her civil marriage to lawyer Kei Komuro on 26 October 2021, Mako gave up her imperial title and left the Imperial Family as required by 1947 Imperial Household Law.

Official duties
The Prince and Princess are called upon to meet with important overseas visitors to improve diplomatic relations. The Princess was chosen as one of the Young Global Leaders for 2007, drawn from a poll of 4000 candidates.

The Prince and Princess have made numerous official visits to foreign countries. In June 2002, they became the first members of the Imperial Family to visit Mongolia, in celebration of the 30th anniversary of diplomatic relations. In October 2002, they visited the Netherlands to attend the funeral of Prince Claus of the Netherlands. In September 2003, the Prince and Princess made goodwill visits to Fiji, Tonga and Samoa, again, the first time ever members of the Imperial Family had visited these countries. In March 2004, the Prince and Princess returned to the Netherlands for the funeral of Queen Juliana of the Netherlands. In January 2005, they visited Luxembourg to attend the funeral of Grand Duchess Joséphine-Charlotte. From October to November 2006, they visited Paraguay to commemorate the 70th anniversary of Japanese emigration to that country. In January 2008, they visited Indonesia for a ceremony commemorating the 50th anniversary of the establishment of diplomatic relations between Japan and the Republic of Indonesia.

They visited Austria, Bulgaria, Hungary, and Romania in May 2009 on the occasion of "Japan-Danube Friendship Year 2009" and the Netherlands in August 2009 for the commemorative event of the 400th anniversary of the trade relations between Japan and the Netherlands. They have visited Costa Rica, Uganda, Croatia, the Slovak Republic, Slovenia, Peru, and Argentina. From June to July 2014, Prince Fumihito and Princess Kiko visited Republic of Zambia and United Republic of Tanzania.

In June–July 2019, the couple carried out the first official overseas visit by the imperial family following the accession of Emperor Naruhito. They visited Poland and Finland to participate in the celebrations for the 100th anniversary of establishment of diplomatic relationship between Japan and the two countries. In August 2019, the couple and their son, Hisahito, arrived in Bhutan for a visit.

Honours

National
 :
 Grand Cordon (Paulownia) of the Order of the Precious Crown
 Dame of the Decoration of the Red Cross
 Recipient of the Red Cross Medal

Foreign
 :
 Grand Cross of the Order of the Crown (11 October 2016)
 :
 Grand Cross of the Order of Adolphe of Nassau (27 November 2017)
 :
 Grand Cross of the Order of the Crown (24 October 2014)
 :
 Grand Cross of the Order of the Sun (27 January 2014)
 :
 Dame Grand Cross of the Order of Isabella the Catholic (8 November 2008)
 :
 Commander Grand Cross of the Order of the Polar Star (26 March 2007)

Honorary positions
 Reserve Member of the Imperial House Council
 Patroness of the Japan Anti-Tuberculosis Association
 President of the Imperial Gift Foundation Boshi-Aiiku-kai
 Honorary Vice-president of the Japanese Red Cross Society
 Honorary Research Fellow of the Japan Society for the Promotion of Science

See also
 Japanese succession debate
 Emperor of Japan: Succession

References

External links

 Their Imperial Highnesses Crown Prince and Crown Princess Akishino and their family at the Imperial Household Agency website

Japanese princesses
1966 births
Living people
People from Shizuoka (city)
Gakushuin University alumni
Ochanomizu University alumni

Grand Cordons (Imperial Family) of the Order of the Precious Crown

Dames Grand Cross of the Order of Isabella the Catholic
Commanders Grand Cross of the Order of the Polar Star
Grand Crosses of the Order of the Crown (Netherlands)
Grand Crosses of the Order of the Crown (Belgium)
Grand Crosses of the Order of the Sun of Peru
20th-century Japanese women
21st-century Japanese women
Sign language interpreters
Princesses by marriage